Bochkaryovka is a rural locality (a village) in Alkinsky Selsoviet, Chishminsky District, Bashkortostan, Russia. The population was 50 as of 2010. There are 10 streets.

Geography 
Bochkaryovka is located 30 km east of Chishmy (the district's administrative centre) by road. Pionerskaya is the nearest rural locality.

References 

Rural localities in Chishminsky District